Cole Robert Winn (born November 25, 1999) is an American professional baseball pitcher in the Texas Rangers organization.

Amateur career
Winn spent his freshman, sophomore, and junior years of high school at Silver Creek High School in Longmont, Colorado. As a junior in 2017 he was 9–0 with a 0.73 ERA with 95 strikeouts in  innings, along with batting .388 with two home runs and 19 RBIs, earning himself the title of Colorado's Gatorade Baseball Player of the Year. That summer, in July, he played in the Under Armour All-America Baseball Game at Wrigley Field. He then transferred to Lutheran High School of Orange County in Orange, California for his senior year. As a senior, he pitched to an 8–2 record with a 0.20 ERA and was named California's Gatorade Baseball Player of the Year and Baseball America's High School Player of the Year. He originally committed to play college baseball for the Notre Dame Fighting Irish, but decommitted and then signed to play for the Mississippi State Bulldogs.

Professional career
Winn was selected 15th overall by the Texas Rangers in the 2018 Major League Baseball draft and signed for $3.15 million.  After signing, Winn did not appear in an official game with a Rangers' affiliate in the 2018 season. Instead, he took part in a new program put in place by Texas for their newly drafted high school pitchers. The "de-load" program, as the organization calls it, emphasizes building a foundation mentally and physically, while resting bodies from a strenuous senior season and pre-draft showcase circuit. The players are put through a strength program and classroom work until post-season fall instructional training starts. Winn was ranked as the #89 overall prospect in baseball by MLB Pipeline in their preseason 2019 Top 100 list. He was also ranked as the #72 overall prospect in baseball by ESPN's Keith Law in his preseason 2019 Top 100 list. He was ranked as the #78 overall prospect in baseball by Fangraphs in their preseason 2019 Top 130 list.

Winn made his professional debut in 2019 when was assigned to the Hickory Crawdads of the Class A South Atlantic League with whom he started 18 games, compiling a 4–4 record with a 4.46 ERA over  innings. Winn spent 2020 at the Rangers Alternate Training Site, due to the cancellation of the season because of the COVID-19 pandemic. To begin the 2021 season, he was assigned to the Frisco RoughRiders of the Double-A Central League. In June, Winn was selected to play in the All-Star Futures Game at Coors Field. In 19 games for Frisco in 2021, Winn posted a 3–3 record with a 2.31 ERA and 97 strikeouts over 78 innings. After the end of Frisco's season in mid-September, he was promoted to the Round Rock Express of the Triple-A West where he posted a 3.38 ERA over two outings. He was named the Rangers' 2021 Nolan Ryan Pitcher of the Year. 

Winn spent the 2022 season back with Round Rock. Over 28 starts, he went 9-8 with a 6.51 ERA, 121.2 strikeouts, and 87 walks (the most in the minor leagues) over  innings.

On November 15, 2022, Winn was selected to the Rangers’ 40-man roster. Winn was optioned to Triple-A Round Rock to begin the 2023 season.

References

External links

1999 births
Living people
People from Longmont, Colorado
Baseball players from Colorado
Baseball pitchers
Hickory Crawdads players
Frisco RoughRiders players
Round Rock Express players